The Suzuki VX800 is a road motorcycle shaft-drive V-twin bike from Suzuki.

The VX800 was designed at U.S. Suzuki's Design Studio in Brea, California from 1986 to 1989, and produced in the years 1990 to 1997.  Lackluster sales in the United States brought the model to an end in 1993, the European version was produced until 1997.

Concept and prototype

Among others, the design team consisted of
Don Presnell, Lead Designer-styling, 
Aki Goto as Lead Engineer and 
Sam Yamazaki for frame and engine engineering.

Sam Yamazaki and Aki Goto were the inspired R&D engineers who started putting together a crude prototype at the Brea Studio utilizing a 750 cc Intruder engine in a modified Intruder frame. The rake and trail were modified on that prototype, as were the footpeg/shifter positions. The prototype was finished off with a hand-hammered aluminum tank mastered by Sam Yamazaki.
The first full scale clay modeling of the VX750 was done by Don Presnell at the Brea facility.
A quote by Don Presnell on the changes made in Japan on the concept.
"The original full-scale clay model that I accompanied over to Japan had a rear fender/seat more like the first sketch. It's true that Japanese management did want to play it safe, so they went with the more traditional styling on the rear fender. Many times a transportation Designer's sketches/models get compromised when it gets to the Marketing Dept. stage!"
The suspension, engine work and final touches on the frame were done in Hammamatsu, Japan, once the concept & design direction were established, at this point it was out of the hands of the U.S. development team.

Variations
There were four variations of the VX800:
the Japanese version featured a slightly shorter frame.
the European version was equipped with the pre-production 75-degree crank pin offset for smoother operation at high engine speeds. 
the American version was offered from 1990 to 1993 only. It was equipped with the Intruder's 45-degree crank pin offset as American Suzuki tests riders claimed the 75-degree crank offset made the engine feel dull and lifeless at US speeds. It also makes for a more charismatic exhaust cadence. American Suzuki also requested that the overall gearing be lower for better acceleration. The USA version has a secondary reduction of 1.133, where other markets have a 1.096 secondary reduction. 
the California version was the same as the USA version, but with additional anti-smog equipment.

Engine
The engine for the VX800 was derived from the Intruder 750, with a 3 mm larger bore to increase displacement, and larger 36 mm carburetors replacing the 34 mm units. The addition of a back torque limiting clutch, similar in operation as the VS1400 Intruder.

Model VS51A, 45-degree crank pin offset, model VS51B, 75-degree crank pin offset
 Type: Four-stroke, water-cooled, OHC TSCC, 45-degree V-twin
 Piston displacement: 805 cc
 Bore & Stroke: 
 Compression ratio: 10.0:1
 Carburetor, front: Mikuni BDS36SS, single
 Carburetor, rear: Mikuni BS36SS, single
 Transmission: 5-speed constant mesh
 Final drive: Shaft, 3.090:1

See also
 Suzuki Intruder
 Naked bike

References

VX800
Standard motorcycles
Motorcycles introduced in 1990